Mount Robert Scott is a small, flat, snow-covered mountain that rises over 1,000 m and is situated immediately south of Ebony Ridge in the Commonwealth Range. It is lying between Mount Harcourt and Mount Kathleen and overlooking the east side of the Beardmore Glacier at its junction with the Ross Ice Shelf.
It was discovered by the British Antarctic Expedition (1907–09) under Ernest Shackleton, who named this feature for Captain Robert F. Scott, RN. Shackleton had been a member of Scott's Southern Polar Party which reached 8217S on the Discovery expedition (1901–04).

Mountains of the Ross Dependency
Dufek Coast